Rytis Juknevičius (born December 15, 1993) is a professional Lithuanian basketball player. He plays the point guard position.

International career 
Juknevičius represented Lithuania men's under-20 national basketball team during the 2013 FIBA Europe Under-20 Championship in Tallinn, Estonia.

References 

1993 births
Living people
Point guards
Lithuanian men's basketball players
Basketball players from Kaunas